Riley M. Matheson (December 12, 1914 – June, 1987) was a professional American football player who played offensive lineman for ten seasons for the Cleveland / Los Angeles Rams, the Detroit Lions, and the San Francisco 49ers.  Playing guard on offense and linebacker on defense, Matheson made both the Associated Press and United Press All-NFL Teams in 1944 and 1945.

Matheson also played two final seasons with the Canadian Football League's Calgary Stampeders, being named an All star both seasons.

The Professional Football Researchers Association named Matheson to the PRFA Hall of Very Good Class of 2010

References

1914 births
1987 deaths
People from Clay County, Texas
American football offensive linemen
UTEP Miners football players
Cleveland Rams players
Detroit Lions players
Los Angeles Rams players
San Francisco 49ers (AAFC) players
Calgary Stampeders players
San Francisco 49ers players